Toscanini is a surname. Notable people with the surname include:
Arturo Toscanini (1867–1957), Italian conductor
Walter Toscanini (1898–1971), son of Arturo Toscanini
Wanda Toscanini (1907–1998), daughter of Arturo Toscanini, wife of pianist Vladimir Horowitz
Yésica Toscanini (born 1986), Argentine fashion model

See also
Toscanini's, an ice cream parlor in Cambridge, Massachusetts
Toscanini: The Maestro, a 1985 documentary film about Arturo Toscanini